The Third Street Film Festival is an independent film festival located in Baton Rouge, Louisiana. The Third Street Film Festival held its inaugural event in December 2011. The second Third Street Film Festival took place in 2012 at the Manship Theatre in Baton Rouge. The Festival's focus is to promote, foster, and unite independent filmmakers by showcasing their work.

History 
The Third Street Film Festival was the first independent film festival held in the capital city of Louisiana. Its films were played to sold-out crowds.

References

Citations

Bibliography
 

Film festivals in Louisiana
Culture of Baton Rouge, Louisiana